Droue-sur-Drouette is a French commune in the department of Eure-et-Loir and the region of Centre-Val de Loire.

Population

See also
Communes of the Eure-et-Loir department

References

Communes of Eure-et-Loir
Eure-et-Loir communes articles needing translation from French Wikipedia